Jared Young Sanders Jr. (April 20, 1892 - November 29, 1960) was an American lawyer and politician who served three terms in the U.S. House of Representatives from 1934 to 1937 and again from 1941 to 1943. He was the son of Louisiana governor Jared Y. Sanders.

Early life and career 
Sanders was born in Franklin, Louisiana and attended Dixon Academy in Louisiana and Washington and Lee University in Lexington, Virginia before graduating from Louisiana State University in 1912. He later matriculated at the Tulane University School of Law, from which he graduated in 1914. He passed the bar that same year and began a private legal practice in Baton Rouge.

World War I 
After America entered World War I Sanders served in the United States Army from May 1917 to April 1919. He was a captain for the Three Hundred and Forty-sixth Infantry, Eighty-seventh Division. After the war, he returned home to Louisiana.

Louisiana politics
He was elected as a Democrat to the Louisiana House of Representatives and served there from 1928 to 1932, when he was elected to the Louisiana Senate. During his time in the state legislature, Sanders gained a reputation as a leading opponent to the policies of Louisiana’s powerful political leader Huey Long.

Congress 
Upon the death of incumbent U.S. Congressman Bolivar E. Kemp, Sanders ran for a seat in the U.S. House of Representatives.

Sanders won election to the U.S. House and took his seat on May 1, 1934. Representing Louisiana’s Sixth Congressional District, he was re-elected in the 1934 general election. In 1936, he was defeated in the Democratic primary by John K. Griffith. Sanders returned to the practice of law but remained active in politics, serving as a delegate at the Democratic National Conventions in 1940 and 1944.

In 1940, Sanders ran again for the 6th District House seat, serving one additional term from 1941 to 1943. In 1942, was again defeated in the Democratic primary, this time by James H. Morrison, and returned to private law practice in Baton Rouge.

Death
Jared Y. Sanders Jr. died in Baton Rouge on November 29, 1960. He is interred at Roselawn Memorial Park.

References 

1892 births
1960 deaths
Democratic Party members of the United States House of Representatives from Louisiana
Louisiana lawyers
Tulane University Law School alumni
Democratic Party members of the Louisiana House of Representatives
Democratic Party Louisiana state senators
Louisiana State University alumni